Karagandoceratoidea is an Early Carboniferous (Mississippian) superfamily within the ammonoid order, Goniatitida, said to contain the Karagandoceratidae and Prodromitidae.

Analysis
Shells are discoidal to lenticular. Adult stages are oxygonic, having acute venters, or have distinct keels.  The ventral lobe may be either bifurcate or trifurcate (two  or three pronged) and there is a tendency to increase the number of elements ontogenetically in the suture.

Taxonomic affinities
In the most recent classifications, W.M. Furnish, et al., 2009  and GONIAT theKaraganoceratoidea, is divided into the families Karagandoceratidae and Prodromitidae, with Karagandoceras, Bartzschiceras and Masonoceras included in the Karagandocertidae.

Previously, Deiter Korn (2006) included Karagandoceras along with  Bartzschiceras and Masonoceras in the subfamily Karagandoceratinae which he included in the Prionoceratidae as part of the Prionocerataceae. Note retention of the—aceae ending. The Prodromitidae is included in the same superfamily.

Members of the Karagandoceratidae are probably derived from different members of the Prioceratidae and therefore is an artificial grouping. The Prodromitidae, with which it is included, has been placed in the Prolecanitidain other classifications.

References

Goniatitida superfamilies
Tornoceratina